Concordia Stadium is multi-purpose stadium at Concordia University in Montreal, Quebec. It is home to the Concordia Stingers. It was built in 2003, and has a seating capacity of 4,000.

External links

 Satellite view of Concordia Stadium on Google Maps
 Quebec Stadiums

Soccer venues in Montreal
Sports venues in Montreal
Concordia Stingers
Canadian football venues in Quebec
Multi-purpose stadiums in Quebec
Côte-des-Neiges–Notre-Dame-de-Grâce